Brian Fentiman (1947 – 20 April 2019) was a lightweight rower who competed for Great Britain.

Rowing career
Fentiman was part of the eight that won the 1973 British Rowing Championships for the Quintin Boat Club. He was selected by Great Britain as part of the lightweight eight that secured a bronze medal at the 1975 World Rowing Championships. The following year he was part of the lightweight eight that secured a silver medal at the 1976 World Rowing Championships in Villach, Austria.

References

1947 births
2019 deaths
British male rowers
World Rowing Championships medalists for Great Britain